Acanthosoma is a genus of shield bugs in the family Acanthosomatidae, found in Europe, Asia, and Oceania. There are more than 20 described species in Acanthosoma.

Species
These species belong to the genus Acanthosoma:

 Acanthosoma alaticorne Walker, 1868</small>
 Acanthosoma crassicaudum Jakovlev, 1880
 Acanthosoma denticaudum Jakovlev, 1880
 Acanthosoma fallax Acanthosoma firmatum (Walker, 1868)
 Acanthosoma forfex Acanthosoma forficula Jakovlev, 1880
 Acanthosoma haemorrhoidale (Linnaeus, 1758) (Hawthorn Shieldbug)
 Acanthosoma hampsoni <small>(Distant, 1900)
 Acanthosoma labiduroides Jakovlev, 1880
 Acanthosoma murreanum (Distant, 1900)</small>
 Acanthosoma nigricorne <small>Walker, 1868
 Acanthosoma nigrodorsum
 Acanthosoma rufescens Dallas, 1851</small>
 Acanthosoma rufispinum <small>(Distant, 1887)
 Acanthosoma sichuanense (Liu, 1980)</small>
 Acanthosoma spinicolle Jakovlev, 1880
 Acanthosoma tauriforme <small>(Distant, 1887)
 † Acanthosoma debile Förster, 1891
 † Acanthosoma joursacensis Piton, 1933
 † Acanthosoma livida Heer, 1853
 † Acanthosoma maculata Heer, 1853
 † Acanthosoma morloti Heer, 1853

References

Further reading

 
 

Acanthosomatidae